Siegman is a surname. Notable people with the surname include: 

Anthony E. Siegman (1931–2011), American electrical engineer and educator
Elena Siegman, American singer, guitarist, songwriter and video game producer
Henry Siegman (born 1930), German-born American academic